Jackson Records is a film and music publishing label based in India. The label and its sub-labels/ imprints are owned and administered by Jackson Records Digital Entertainment LLP (formerly known as Digisys Media Network until July 2014). Jackson Records as a label started functioning from December, 2011.

Background
While delivering media services to other business concerns and artists since 2007, Jackson Records was named as a label in 2011.

Jackson Records was previously known only as a record label under parent Digisys Media Network until July 2014, when it was deemed to be a digital services network under the newly autonomous label - Jackson Records. It was then, when the company got the new name Jackson Records Media & Strategics, now incorporated as Jackson Records Digital Entertainment LLP.

Genres and sector
Jackson Records started with indie rock and metal bands from around the globe in compilation albums, followed by regional and National linguistic projects in Bengali and Hindi respectively. Jackson Records also controls and owns rights of third party music catalogs/ repertoire from Upasana Entertainment Pvt. Ltd.

Parent company
Jackson Records Digital Entertainment was founded in 2007 by Utsav Bhanja, an Indian entrepreneur and artist. The firm provided digital media marketing solutions to individuals and organizations. At present Jackson Records Digital Entertainment LLP's clientele domain includes music and film producers, directors, artists, and other media concerns. The company also owns, sub-licenses and operates a group of media and entertainment websites, grouped under Jackson Records Content Network.

Major Releases

References
Notes

Bibliography
 Shesh Ontora album on Apple iTunes 
 Shiddat worldwide release by Jackson Records, UK Pressbox News 
 Jackson Records releases Incarnation vol. 2, AddiQtd.com Entertainment News 
 Srutinatak Reaches New Heights, AddiQtd.com 
 Dhwani EP from Jackson Records on iTunes, Apple iTunes

External links
 Jackson Records Official Website
 Utsav Bhanja Official Website

Indian music record labels
Record labels established in 2011
Indian record labels